Naseer Ahmad Bunda (15 May 1932 – 20 March 1993) was a field hockey player from Pakistan. He was born in Rawalpindi. He was a silver medalist from 1956 Summer Olympics and a gold medalist from 1960 Summer Olympics. Naseer scored the solitary winning goal in the final for  Pakistan against arch-rivals India in 1960 Rome Olympics to clinch the first ever  gold in the Olympic history of the country. He scored total of 43 International goals in 44 appearances for Pakistan.   He also received Pride of Performance award from Government of Pakistan in 1962.

References

External links
 

1932 births
1993 deaths
Pakistani male field hockey players
Olympic field hockey players of Pakistan
Olympic gold medalists for Pakistan
Olympic silver medalists for Pakistan
Olympic medalists in field hockey
Medalists at the 1960 Summer Olympics
Medalists at the 1956 Summer Olympics
Field hockey players at the 1956 Summer Olympics
Field hockey players at the 1960 Summer Olympics
Asian Games medalists in field hockey
Field hockey players at the 1958 Asian Games
Field hockey players at the 1962 Asian Games
Recipients of the Pride of Performance
Field hockey players from Rawalpindi
Asian Games gold medalists for Pakistan
Medalists at the 1962 Asian Games
Medalists at the 1958 Asian Games